Zbyněk Brynych (13 June 1927 – 24 August 1995) was a Czech film director and screenwriter. He directed 30 films between 1951 and 1985.

Selected filmography
Czechoslovakia
 Suburban Romance (1958)
 Five in a Million (1959)
 Skid (1960)
 Every Penny Counts (1961)
 Don't Take Shelter When It Rains! (1962)
 Transport from Paradise (1962)
 Constellation of the Virgo (1965)
 The Fifth Horseman Is Fear (1965)
 Transit Carlsbad (1966)
 I, Justice (1968)

Germany
 Der Kommissar (1969–1970, TV series, 4 episodes)
  (1970)
  (1970)
  (1970)
 The Night in Lisbon (1971, TV film)
 Derrick (1975–1994, TV series, 37 episodes)
 The Old Fox (1978–1994, TV series, 45 episodes)

External links
 

1927 births
1995 deaths
Czech film directors
Czech screenwriters
Male screenwriters
People from Karlovy Vary
20th-century screenwriters